Wolfert Acker (1667–1753) was a colonial-period American who is featured in Washington Irving's short story collection Wolfert's Roost and Miscellanies (1855). His name was recorded in all combinations of Wolfert or Wolvert as given name, and Acker, Echert, Eckar, or Ecker as surname. He was born in Flatbush, Brooklyn, New York and died at his sizable home, "Wolfert's Roost" (or "Wolfert's Rest") near the site of what is now Irvington, New York in Westchester County, New York. On December 20, 1692, on land belonging to Frederick Philipse, he married Maretje Sibouts.

Acker served the British colonial government as collector of Philipsburg Manor in New Netherlands. He was a quiet man whose favorite phrase was "Rust in Lust" (peace in quiet) but always found himself working for very loud and active governors; he was, at one point, privy counsellor to Peter Stuyvesant, before eventually retiring to Wolfert's Roost. William Owens believes that, despite his high status, Wolfert may have been a tenant of Philipse. Tenant or not, Wolfert did have the second largest house in the region, second only to Philipse Manor Hall, which still stands.

Jan Ecker, Wolfert's brother, was the first deacon of the Old Dutch Church of Sleepy Hollow, which was founded by Philipse, and was still living in May 1716. Wolfert Acker became the second deacon and later, an Elder. However, by May 1716, he and his wife Maritie were two of eight members no longer on the roll, although their names continued to appear as baptismal witnesses until 1734. Acker is entombed beneath the floorboards of the church along with other Elders, beside Philipse and his wife.

Acker had three sons, Steven, Siber, and Abraham, and each son was married and named a son Wolfert. From Abraham's line came Abraham II and Wolfert II, the American "patriot" and Whig coordinator who lived in Marlborough, New York (where his house, Hill House, still stands) and founder of the Acker Ferry between Newburgh, New York and what became in 1913 part of Beacon, New York. Abraham's connection to the Van Tassel family is cited in "The Legend of Sleepy Hollow", and it was through their association with a rebellious Van Tassel scion during the revolutionary period that the Ackers lost Wolfert's Roost.

Wolfert's property was passed along in his family for some time, but was eventually broken up and sold off. One person who bought his land was Washington Irving who took an existing structure and made his romantic Sunnyside out of it. The actual Wolfert's Roost was burned down by the British after the brother-in-law of Catriena Ecker Van Tassel shot at the British sloops with a goose-rifle charged with nails.

Eckar Street in Irvington, New York is named for him.

References
Notes

External links
 The Van Tassel Family History Homepage

1667 births
1753 deaths
American Christian clergy
18th-century Christian clergy
People of the Province of New York
American members of the Dutch Reformed Church
People from Flatbush, Brooklyn
People from Irvington, New York
18th-century American clergy